BMU may refer to:
 Baba Mast Nath University, Haryana, India
 Basic multicellular unit, temporary structure for bone remodeling
 Battery management or monitoring unit, see battery management system
 Beachmaster Unit One, a United States Navy amphibious beach party unit
 Bi-mode multiple unit, a type of train, see electro-diesel multiple unit
 BMU, the ISO-3166 code for Bermuda
Building maintenance unit, a device used to assist in the maintenance of large structures
 Bundesministerium für Umwelt, Naturschutz und Reaktorsicherheit, a ministry of the Federal Republic of Germany
 Business and Management University, today BMU Lebanese French University